Gay City: Seattle's LGBTQ Center, formerly known as Gay City Health Project, is a 501(c)3 multicultural LGBTQ nonprofit organization based in Seattle, Washington.

Gay City formed in 1995 during the HIV/AIDS epidemic.  In the mid-2000s, Gay City introduced a Wellness Center that provided HIV testing and STI screening (syphilis, chlamydia, gonorrhea, and Hepatitis C). The health services expanded in 2019 to five locations.

In 2007, Gay City served as a research partner for the Seattle branch of the HIV Vaccine Trials Network.

The LGBTQ library was formerly held by the Seattle LGBT Community Center until it closed in 2009 and moved to Gay City.

References

External links

1995 establishments in Washington (state)
Non-profit organizations based in Seattle
LGBT health organizations in the United States
LGBT in Washington (state)
Men's health organizations
Organizations established in 1995
Medical and health organizations based in Washington (state)
LGBT culture in Seattle